Mammea grandifolia is a species of flowering plant in the Calophyllaceae family. It is found only in Papua New Guinea.

References

Endemic flora of Papua New Guinea
Vulnerable plants
grandifolia
Taxonomy articles created by Polbot